The 2008 Shiraz bombing was an April 12, 2008 explosion that occurred during prayers at the Hosseynieh Seyed al-Shohada Mosque in the southern Iranian city of Shiraz, Fars province. Fourteen people were killed and 202 were injured.

Event
According to Al Jazeera, reports showed that the explosion occurred in the side where males were praying. Around 800 people, which were mostly youth, were gathered at the Mosque to hear sermons which usually include sermons attacking the Wahabi denomination of Sunni Islam and the Baháʼí Faith. According to the BBC, the explosion shattered windows of several houses that were close to the mosque, as reported by Iran News Agency.

The deputy governor of the province, Mohammad Reza Hadaegh, told IRIB an investigation was under way. Iranian officials first stated that the blast was not a terrorist attack, but caused by leftover munitions that were on display in the mosque as part of an exhibition commemorating Iran's 1980–1988 war against Iraq. However, in May, Interior Minister Mostafa Pour-Mohammadi said the blast was an act of terrorism and 12 terrorists had been arrested before attacking the Russian Consulate and religious centers in Qom. Intelligence Minister Gholam Hossein Mohseni-Ejehei accused United States and Britain of involvement in the bombing and attempted to press charges against the two countries.

In November 2008, Iran sentenced three men to death after they were convicted of the bombing. One of these men, Mehdi Eslamian, was hanged with four others on May 9, 2010. His brother had previously been hanged for the bombing.

Victims
List of victims

See also
 2007 Zahedan bombings
 Ahvaz bombings
 Shah Cheragh massacre

References

Terrorism deaths in Iran
Terrorist incidents in Iran
Mass murder in 2008
Shiraz
Mosque bombings in Asia
Explosions in Iran
Attacks on buildings and structures in Iran
Terrorist incidents in Iran in 2008
2008 murders in Iran